Delayed blisters are a cutaneous condition observed weeks to months after the initial healing of second-degree thermal burns, donor sites of split-thickness skin grafts, and recipient sites of split-thickness skin grafts.

See also 
 Coma blister
 List of cutaneous conditions

References 

Skin conditions resulting from physical factors